
Year 762 (DCCLXII) was a common year starting on Friday (link will display the full calendar) of the Julian calendar. The denomination 762 for this year has been used since the early medieval period, when the Anno Domini calendar era became the prevalent method in Europe for naming years.

Events 
 By place 

 Europe 
 Vinekh, ruler (khagan) of the Bulgarian Empire, dies after a six-year reign. He is succeeded by Telets, ending the rule of the Vokil clan, and beginning the reign of the Ugain clan.
 Al-Ala ibn Mugith, supporter of the Abbasid cause, is defeated by the Umayyad emir of al-Andalus, Abd al-Rahman I, at Beja (modern-day Portugal).

 Britain 
 King Æthelbert II of Kent dies, and is succeeded by his nephew Eadberht II. He possibly rules all Kent for a time. Sigered, probably an East Saxon, succeeds in West Kent. Eadberht dies after a short reign, followed by Ealhmund as ruler of Kent.
 King Æthelwald of Northumbria marries his queen, Æthelthryth, at Catterick (North Yorkshire).

 Abbasid Caliphate 
 July 30 – Caliph al-Mansur moves the seat of the Abbasid Caliphate from Kufa to the new capital of Baghdad.
 September 25 – The Alid Revolt begins: Muhammad al-Nafs al-Zakiyya raises the banner against the Abbasids at Medina, followed by his brother Ibrahim ibn Abdallah at Basra in early 763. Muhammad's rebellion is suppressed, and he is killed by Abbasid troops under Isa ibn Musa.

 Asia 
 The Chinese official Li Fuguo murders Empress Zhang, wife of Emperor Su Zong. Shortly afterward Su Zong dies of a heart attack; he is succeeded by his son Dai Zong, who kills Li by sending assassins.

 By topic 

 Religion 
 Schäftlarn Abbey (Bavaria) is founded by Waltrich, a Benedictine monk of noble family, south of modern-day Munich, Germany.

Births 
 Æthelred I, king of Northumbria (d. 796)
 Sayyida Nafisa, Arab scholar (d. 824)

Deaths 
 Æthelbert II, king of Kent
 Ashot III, Armenian prince 
 Eadberht II, king of Kent
 Eardwulf, king of Kent
 Gao Lishi, Chinese official and eunuch (b. 684)
 Li Bai, (also Li Po), Chinese poet (b. 701)
 Li Fuguo, Chinese official and eunuch (b. 704)
 Milo, Frankish bishop (or 763)
 Muhammad al-Nafs al-Zakiyya, Arab rebel leader 
 Su Zong, emperor of the Tang dynasty (b. 711)
 Vinekh, ruler (khagan) of the Bulgarian Empire
 Xuan Zong, emperor of Tang dynasty (b. 685)
 Zhang, empress of the Tang dynasty

References